The Olmenhorn is a mountain of the Bernese Alps, overlooking the Aletsch Glacier in the canton of Valais.

References

External links
 Olmenhorn on Hikr

Mountains of the Alps
Alpine three-thousanders
Mountains of Switzerland
Mountains of Valais
Bernese Alps